The Florida State Seminoles men's basketball team represents Florida State University (variously Florida State or FSU) in the intercollegiate sport of basketball. The Seminoles compete in the National Collegiate Athletic Association (NCAA) Division I and the Atlantic Coast Conference (ACC).

Though they have historically played under the shadow of the football program, the Seminoles have had successes on the hardwood. Florida State has made eighteen NCAA tournament appearances: advancing to the Round of 32 on twelve occasions, the Sweet Sixteen on seven occasions, the Elite Eight on three occasions, and the Final Four once, moving on to the championship game and finishing as runner-up. In 2020, despite holding final rankings of #4 in the AP Poll and #5 in the Coaches Poll, Florida State was "declared" the 2020 NCAA Division I Men's Basketball Champions by Florida Governor Ron DeSantis and the Florida State Legislature after the  2020 NCAA Tournament was canceled due to the COVID-19 pandemic. This declaration holds no merit with the NCAA, but it is the only claim FSU basketball has to a national title. Florida State has also made ten appearances in the National Invitation Tournament.

In the 77 season history of the Seminole basketball program, the Seminoles have won the regular season conference title five times and the conference tournament title four times, including two ACC championships.
 
Florida State has had 23 All-Americans, 26 players inducted into the Hall of Fame, and 36 players that went on to play in the NBA. Jeff Sagarin and ESPN listed the program 74th in the college basketball all-time rankings in the 'ESPN College Basketball Encyclopedia'.

The Seminoles play their home games in the Donald L. Tucker Center on the university's Tallahassee, Florida campus. The current head men's basketball coach is Leonard Hamilton, in his twenty-first year.

Overview
The Florida State Seminoles men's team annually plays an eighteen-game conference schedule that is preceded by an out-of-conference schedule against few annual opponents except for Florida. Their conference schedule consists of a home-and-home game against two permanent rivals (Miami and Clemson), alternating home-and-home games against the other fourteen ACC teams.

History
Florida State University has officially fielded a basketball team since 1947, and the Seminoles are currently in their 78th season of play.

Don Loucks era (1947–1948)
Hugh Donald Loucks served as the first basketball coach for the Florida State Seminoles. He coached at the school for one year and compiled an overall record of 5–13, becoming one of only two coaches to leave the program with a losing record of 11 games.

J.K. Kennedy era (1949–1966)
After the departure of Loucks, J.K. Kennedy became the coach. He was the first coach to find success at Florida State, holding the position for 18 years and compiling a record of 234–208.

Hugh Durham era (1966–1978)
Hugh Durham played at Florida State in the 1950s, scoring 1,381 points in three years. His average of 21.9 points per game in 1958–59 is the seventh best tally in Florida State history. Durham's career average of 18.9 points per game is still the ninth best in school history. After his playing career had ended, he began his coaching career as an assistant coach in 1959. Seven years later, Durham would be named head coach in 1966. One of the top players during this time was future NBA Hall-of-Famer Dave Cowens. Durham led the Seminoles from 1966 to 1978. In 1972, Durham led Florida State to a runner-up finish in the NCAA Tournament. A hard-fought 81–76 loss to the top-ranked UCLA Bruins in the NCAA Championship game prevented Durham's Florida State team from winning the NCAA tournament. Another key player for the Seminoles was Harry Davis, who helped the program sustain stability.

Durham's overall record at Florida State was a 230–95 record with three NCAA tournament bids. He still owns the highest winning percentage of any Florida State coach at .708. Durham is the only coach in NCAA history to be the all-time winningest coach (percentage or wins) at three different Division I schools.

Joe Williams era (1978–1986)
After the departure of Hugh Durham, Joe Williams took over the Seminole basketball program. One of the standout players during this period was George McCloud. McCloud helped the Seminoles rebuild after the departure of Durham by becoming one of the most prolific scorers in FSU history. During his senior season, McCloud had the second-highest scoring average and the sixth-highest in Florida State history. Joe Williams would coach his final season in 1986.

Pat Kennedy era (1986–1997)
The 1992–1993 season would see the emergence of one of the Seminoles' best players in its history, Bob Sura. Not much was expected of the Seminoles in 1992 as they entered into their first season in the ACC, yet they finished second in the conference to national champion Duke. The team repeated the second-place finish in 1993, establishing itself as a legitimate national power. In the 1993 NCAA Tournament they fell to Kentucky in the Elite Eight round.  In Kennedy's final season (1996–1997) he led the team to the NIT Final, losing to the Michigan Wolverines.

Steve Robinson era (1997–2002)
Steve Robinson took over the program for the 1997–1998 season and led the Seminoles to the NCAA Tournament his first year.  However, the team suffered losing records the next four seasons and Robinson left the program after the 2001–2002 campaign.  Robinson is now an assistant coach with the Arizona Wildcats.

Leonard Hamilton era (2002–present)

Leonard Hamilton became Florida State's seventh head basketball coach on March 19, 2002. In two years, Tim Pickett scored 1,039 points, earning him First-Team All-ACC and All-American Honorable Mention honors. Hamilton was named ACC Coach of the Year in 2009, 2012, and 2020. Hamilton is also the first Seminole coach to win an ACC Championship, capturing the league tournament title in 2012 and the regular season title in 2020. He has led the Seminoles to eight NCAA tournament appearances. During his tenure, Florida State has been the third-most successful team in the conference. Hamilton is the winningest coach in the program's history, the fifth winningest coach in conference history, and has sent nineteen players to the NBA draft, including nine first round picks.

Head coaches

Current coaching staff

Home court

Donald L. Tucker Center

The Seminoles play all of their home games at the Donald L. Tucker Center. It is a  multi-purpose facility which has hosted over 25 years worth of Seminole games. Since the 2016–2017 season, the Seminoles have gone undefeated twice at home and had twenty-five consecutive conference victories on their home court, the second longest streak in conference history.

Championships

National Championship appearance

Florida State has appeared in the NCAA Division I Tournament's National Championship game once, in 1972. The Seminoles, coached by Hugh Durham, lost to John Wooden and his UCLA Bruins, 81–76, at the Memorial Sports Arena in Los Angeles, California. The Seminoles defeated powerhouse Kentucky in the Mideast Region Final and North Carolina in the Final Four.

Regional Championship
Florida State defeated Kentucky, 73–54, to win their only regional championship.

NIT Championship appearance
Florida State has appeared in the National Invitation Tournament's National Championship game once, in 1997. The Seminoles, coached by Pat Kennedy, lost to Michigan, coached by Steve Fisher, 82–73, at Madison Square Garden in New York City.

Conference tournament championships

Conference Affiliations

1947: Independent
1948–1951: Dixie Conference
1951–1954: Independent
1954–1957: Florida Intercollegiate Conference
1957–1976: Independent
1976–1991: Metro Conference
1991–present: Atlantic Coast Conference

Conference regular season championships

Records and results

Year-by-year results

Note: W = Wins, L = Losses, C = Conference

*122 total wins vacated from the 2006–2007 basketball season due to the academic scandal
*27 ACC wins vacated from the 2006–2007 basketball season due to the academic scandal

Polls
Florida State has ended their basketball season ranked 15 times in either the AP or Coaches Poll.
Top-10 finishes are colored ██

A second-place ranking is the best the team has ever received.

Regular season tournaments

ACC-Big Ten Challenge
The Seminoles have participated in the ACC-Big Ten Challenge 24 times, compiling a record of 10–14.

All-time record vs. ACC teams

*^wins vacated from the 2006–2007 basketball season due to the academic scandal

Rivals

*^wins vacated from the 2006–2007 basketball season due to the academic scandal

College Gameday

The Seminoles have appeared on ESPN's College Game Day twice, hosting the program once, in 2012, when the North Carolina Tar Heels played in Tallahassee. The Seminoles have a 1–0 record when Gameday is on campus.

FSU vs. AP Ranked #1

NCAA tournament results
The Seminoles have appeared in the NCAA tournament 18 times. Their combined record is 24–18; current head coach Leonard Hamilton has a record of 14–11 in the tournament.

NCAA tournament seeding
The NCAA began seeding the tournament with the 1979 edition.

NIT results
The Seminoles have appeared in the National Invitation Tournament (NIT) ten times. Their combined record is 14–10.

NIT seeding
The NCAA began seeding the tournament with the 2006 edition.

ACC Tournament results
The ACC men's basketball tournament is the conference championship tournament in basketball for the Atlantic Coast Conference.  It is a single-elimination tournament and seeding is based on regular season records. The winner receives the conference's automatic bid to the NCAA basketball tournament.

Florida State has won the ACC Tournament once, in 2012, under coach Leonard Hamilton. The Seminoles have a record of 20–30 at the ACC Tournament.

Awards

All-Americans

Collegiate All-Americans (Associated Press)
Dave Fedor, 1961 & 1962 All-American (Honorable Mention)
Dave Cowens, 1970 All-American (Honorable Mention)
Harry Davis, 1978 All-American (Honorable Mention)
Mickey Dillard, 1981 All-American (Honorable Mention)
Mitchell Wiggins, 1982 & 1983 All-American (Honorable Mention)
Alton Lee Gipson, 1984 All-American (Honorable Mention)
George McCloud, 1989 All-American (3rd Team)
Sam Cassell, 1992 All-American (Honorable Mention)
Doug Edwards, 1993 All-American (Honorable Mention)
Charlie Ward, 1993 All-American (Honorable Mention)
Bob Sura, 1993 & 1994 & 1995 All-American (Honorable Mention)
Tim Pickett, 2004 All-American (Honorable Mention)
Al Thornton, 2007 All-American (3rd Team)
Toney Douglas, 2009 All-American (3rd Team)
McDonald's All-Americans
David White, 1987 Selection
Doug Edwards, 1989 Selection
LaMarr Greer, 1994 Selection
Corey Louis, 1994 Selection
Randell Jackson, 1995 Selection
Anthony Richardson, 2001 Selection
Von Wafer, 2003 Selection
Chris Singleton, 2008 Selection
Michael Snaer, 2009 Selection
Dwayne Bacon, 2015 Selection
M.J. Walker, 2017 Selection
Scottie Barnes, 2020 Selection
Jonathan Isaac was ineligible in 2016 due to his status as a postgraduate student

Conference awards
ACC Coach of the Year
Pat Kennedy (1992)
Leonard Hamilton (2009, 2012, 2020)

ACC Defensive Player of the Year 
Toney Douglas (2009)
Chris Singleton (2010)

ACC Sixth Man of the Year 
Mfiondu Kabengele (2019)
Patrick Williams (2020)
Scottie Barnes (2021)
Matthew Cleveland (2022)

ACC Rookie/Freshman of the Year
Bob Sura (1992)
Scottie Barnes (2021)

Players

Notable alumni

Braian Angola (born 1994), Colombian basketball player who plays for Ironi Nes Ziona of the Israeli Basketball Premier League
Dwayne Bacon, former NBA player
Scottie Barnes, NBA player, Toronto Raptors, Lottery selection (2021), 2022 NBA Rookie of the Year
Malik Beasley, NBA player, Minnesota Timberwolves, 1st round selection
Sam Cassell, former NBA player, 1x NBA All Star, current coach with Philadelphia 76ers
Dave Cowens, former NBA player, *Lottery Selection (1970), Basketball Hall of Fame, College Basketball Hall of Fame, 1973 NBA MVP, 8x NBA All Star
Toney Douglas, former NBA player, player for Hapoel Eilat of the Israeli Basketball Premier League
Hugh Durham, former player & coach, College Basketball Hall of Fame
Trent Forrest, NBA player, Utah Jazz, winningest player in school history
Mark Gilbert, former MLB player, former US Ambassador to New Zealand and Samoa
RaiQuan Gray, NBA player, Brooklyn Nets
Jonathan Isaac, NBA player, Orlando Magic, Lottery Selection (2017)
Mfiondu Kabengele, NBA player, Cleveland Cavaliers, nephew of Dikembe Mutombo
Balša Koprivica, NBA player, Detroit Pistons
Terance Mann, NBA Player, Los Angeles Clippers, 2nd round selection (2019)
George McCloud, former NBA player, Lottery Selection (1989)
Bob Sura, former NBA player
Al Thornton, former NBA player, Lottery Selection (2007)
Devin Vassell, NBA player, San Antonio Spurs, Lottery Selection (2020)
Charlie Ward, former NBA player, 1993 Heisman Trophy
Mitchell Wiggins, former NBA player
Patrick Williams, NBA player, Chicago Bulls, Lottery Selection (2020)

Retired numbers

Honored jerseys
Some jerseys have been honored although their numbers are still active.

Hall of Fame inductees
One FSU player and coach has been inducted into the College Basketball Hall of Fame.

NBA draft
FSU Has had 32 players drafted in the first 60 picks (modern draft equivalent) of the NBA draft:

 1. 1962 NBA Draft, 3rd Round, 23rd Pick, Dave Fedor, Former NBA Player
 2. 1970 NBA Draft, 1st Round, 4th Pick, Dave Cowens, Former NBA Player, Hall of Fame, 1973 NBA MVP, 8x NBA All Star 
 3. 1970 NBA Draft, 3rd Round, 38th Pick, Willie Williams, Former NBA Player 
 4. 1978 NBA Draft, 2nd Round, 33rd Pick, Harry Davis, Former NBA Player 
 5. 1981 NBA Draft, 2nd Round, 42nd Pick, Elvis Rolle, Former NBA Player 
 6. 1981 NBA Draft, 3rd Round, 55th Pick, Mickey Dillard, Former NBA Player 
 7. 1983 NBA Draft, 1st Round, 23rd Pick, Mitchell Wiggins, Former NBA Player 
 8. 1989 NBA Draft, 1st Round, 7th Pick, George McCloud, Former NBA Player 
 9. 1993 NBA Draft, 1st Round, 15th Pick, Doug Edwards, Former NBA Player
10. 1993 NBA Draft, 1st Round, 24th Pick, Sam Cassell, Former NBA Player, 1x NBA All Star
11. 1994 NBA Draft, 1st Round, 26th pick, Charlie Ward, Former NBA Player 
12. 1995 NBA Draft, 1st Round, 17th Pick, Bob Sura, Former NBA Player 
13. 1997 NBA Draft, 2nd Round, 36th Pick, James Collins, Former NBA Player 
Leonard Hamilton Becomes Head Coach (2002)
14. 2004 NBA Draft, 2nd Round, 44th Pick, Tim Pickett, Former NBA Player
15. 2005 NBA Draft, 2nd Round, 39th Pick, Von Wafer, Former NBA Player
16. 2006 NBA Draft, 2nd Round, 45th Pick, Alexander Johnson, Former NBA Player 
17. 2007 NBA Draft, 1st Round, 14th Pick, Al Thornton, Former NBA Player 
18. 2009 NBA Draft, 1st Round, 29th Pick, Toney Douglas, Former NBA Player 
19. 2010 NBA Draft, 2nd Round, 50th Pick, Solomon Alabi, Former NBA Player 
20. 2010 NBA Draft, 2nd Round, 57th Pick, Ryan Reid, Former NBA Player
21. 2011 NBA Draft, 1st Round, 18th Pick, Chris Singleton, Former NBA Player 
22. 2012 NBA Draft, 2nd Round, 33rd Pick, Bernard James, Former NBA Player
23. 2016 NBA Draft, 1st Round, 19th Pick, Malik Beasley, NBA Player, Minnesota Timberwolves
24. 2017 NBA Draft, 1st Round, 6th Pick, Jonathan Isaac, NBA Player, Orlando Magic 
25. 2017 NBA Draft, 2nd Round, 40th Pick, Dwayne Bacon, NBA Player, Orlando Magic
26. 2019 NBA Draft, 1st Round, 27th Pick, Mfiondu Kabengele, NBA Player, Cleveland Cavaliers 
27. 2019 NBA Draft, 2nd Round, 48th Pick, Terance Mann, NBA Player, Los Angeles Clippers 
28. 2020 NBA Draft, 1st Round, 4th Pick, Patrick Williams, NBA Player, Chicago Bulls
29. 2020 NBA Draft, 1st Round, 11th Pick, Devin Vassell, NBA Player, San Antonio Spurs 
30. 2021 NBA Draft, 1st Round, 4th Pick, Scottie Barnes, NBA Player, Toronto Raptors 
31. 2021 NBA Draft, 2nd Round, 57th Pick, Balša Koprivica, NBA Player, Detroit Pistons 
32. 2021 NBA Draft, 2nd Round, 59th Pick, RaiQuan Gray, NBA Player, Brooklyn Nets 
Lottery selections (or their pre-lottery equivalent) are italicized

Mascot
Florida State recently revived the character of Cimarron, a costume mascot that makes appearances at many FSU athletic events and functions. In addition, the character makes public appearances and is available for functions at area schools and service projects, as well as with the spirit groups.

See also
Florida State Seminoles women's basketball
History of Florida State University
List of Florida State University professional athletes

References

Bibliography
Florida State Seminoles Men's Basketball Media Guide, University Athletic Association, Tallahassee, Florida

External links

 

 
1947 establishments in Florida